An Measured Environmental Concentration (MEC) relates to a chemical substance found in an environmental sample. The concentration of the compound may result from direct contamination, transformation and/or metabolization of a different chemical contaminant, natural origin or a combination of these sources. 

MEC is to be used as a reference in the context of Chemical Safety Assessments (CSA) and should be compared with the respective Predicted Environmental Concentration (PEC) and  Predicted No-Effect Concentration (PNEC) in order to decide whether exposure model is valid and the compound related risk is controlled.

References

Chemical safety
Concentration indicators
Toxicology